Fabien Devecchi is a French rugby league footballer who represented France national rugby league team in the 2000 World Cup. He remains in a role at Villeneuve Leopards, but no longer as head coach, having been replaced by Olivier Janzac in Mar 2021.

Playing career
Devecchi played for Paris Saint-Germain, Widnes Vikings and Grand Avignon XIII.

He played in twenty test matches for France, including the 2000 World Cup and 2001 tour of New Zealand and Papua New Guinea.

Coaching career
On 9 March 2021 Villeneuve reported that he dismissed as head coach and replaced by Olivier Janzac.

References

1975 births
Living people
France national rugby league team captains
France national rugby league team players
French rugby league players
Paris Saint-Germain Rugby League players
Rugby league halfbacks
Sporting Olympique Avignon players
Villeneuve Leopards coaches
Widnes Vikings players